Wegman is a surname. Notable people with the surname include:

 Bill Wegman, Major League Baseball player
 Dorothy Wegman Raphaelson, American dancer, Ziegfeld Girl and vaudeville performer, and novelist
 Edward Wegman, American professor of statistics
 Janine Wegman, Dutch musician and artist
 Marie Wegman, All-American Girls Professional Baseball League player
 Robert Wegman, merchant
 William Wegman (photographer)

See also
 Wegman report
 Wegmans
 Wegmans LPGA
 Collège Louise Wegman is a non-denominational school serving students in Kindergarten

See also
 Wegmann